Jeziorna may refer to the following places:
Jeziorna, Łódź Voivodeship (central Poland)
Jeziorna, Lubusz Voivodeship (west Poland)
Jeziorna, West Pomeranian Voivodeship (north-west Poland)